Zarya (The Sunrise) was a sailing-motor schooner built in 1952, and since 1953 used by the USSR Academy of Sciences to study Earth's magnetic field.

After the Continuation War Finland was ordered by the USSR to provide 50 wooden sailing-motor fishing schooners as reparations. One of them was taken, and in 1952 modified, into a low magnetic research vessel named Zarya for the Pushkov Institute of Terrestrial Magnetism, Ionosphere and Radiowave Propagation (IZMIRAN). From 1953 the ship was used to measure the magnetic field of the Earth. She participated in the International Geophysical Year in 1957–1958.

In 1991 IZMIRAN was transferred to the Russian Academy of Sciences.

In 1976 a rupes on planet Mercury was named after the ship, the "Zarya Rupes".

See also 
 Carnegie (yacht), another ship for which a rupes on Mercury is named

References

External links

 History of Zarya from one of its crewmen (in russian)
 History of Russian research fleet formation
 Photo of Zarya at Odessa in 1959   from LIFE
 Photo of Russian non-magnetic oceanographic research vessel ZARJA (or ZARYA) in Antwerp July 1983

Schooners
Research vessels of Russia
Research vessels of the Soviet Union
1952 ships
Ships built in Turku